The 1964 Little All-America college football team is composed of college football players from small colleges and universities who were selected by the Associated Press (AP) as the best players at each position.

Separate defensive teams
For 1964, the AP resumed selecting separate offensive and defensive teams. They had done so previously in 1951 and 1952, but in 1953 returned to the older tradition of selecting eleven players on a team, without regard to offensive or defensive specialization. 
Another change adopted in 1964 was the specialization of the selection of backs. Previously, the AP had simply selected four "backs" without regard to their roles as quarterback, halfback, or fullback. The 1964 offensive units chose players in those specific roles, and the defensive units chose included both defensive halfbacks and safeties.

Backfield
Senior quarterback Charlie Green led the 1964 Wittenberg Tigers football team to their third consecutive undefeated season and the No. 1 ranking in the AP small college rankings. He passed for 5,739 yards in four years at Wittenberg. He was later inducted into the College Football Hall of Fame.

Junior halfback Randy Schultz of the State College of Iowa Panthers received first-team honors after tallying more rushing yards than all of the Panthers' opponents.

Halfback Gerald Allen of Omaha received first-team honors despite having missed part of the season with a leg injury. He rushed for 213 yards against Bradley.

William Cline, a triple-threat tailback for the Tangerine Bowl champion 1964 East Carolina Pirates football team, was also named to the first team.

Others

Otis Taylor helped lead the undefeated 1964 Prairie View A&M Panthers football team to the black college national championship.  He was selected to the first team as an end and later spent 11 years with the Kansas City Chiefs, leading the AFL in receiving touchdowns in 1967 and the NFL in receiving yards in 1971.

Alphonse Dotson, a 268-pound offensive tackle for Grambling, also received first-team honors on one of the major All-America teams.

First team

Offense
 Quarterback - Charlie Green (senior, 6'0", 170 pounds), Wittenberg
 Halfback - Gerald Allen (junior, 6'1", 202 pounds), Omaha
 Halfback - William Cline (senior, 5'11", 178 pounds), East Carolina
 Fullback - Randy Schultz (junior, 6'1", 200 pounds), State College of Iowa
 End - Otis Taylor (senior, 6'4", 210 pounds), Prairie View
 End - Tom Mitchell (junior, 6'2", 212 pounds), Bucknell
 Tackle - William Fuller (senior, 6'4", 240 pounds), Sacramento State
 Tackle - Alphonse Dotson (senior, 6'5", 268 pounds), Grambling
 Guard - Dan Summers (junior, 6'2", 218 pounds), Arkansas State
 Guard - Walter Johnson (junior, 6'3", 260 pounds), Los Angeles State
 Center - Norman Musser (senior, 5'10", 190 pounds), Linfield

Defense
 Defensive end - Milt Morin (junior, 6'4", 248 pounds), UMass
 Defensive end - Dave Jauqut (senior, 6'1", 195 pounds), St. Norbert
 Defensive tackle - John Smith (senior, 6'3", 245 pounds), Maryland State
 Defensive tackle - Robert Burles (junior, 6'3", 220 pounds), Willamette
 Linebacker - Dale Lindsey (junior, 6'3", 215 pounds), Western Kentucky
 Linebacker - Louis Pastorini (junior, 5'11", 200 pounds), Santa Clara
 Linebacker - Dick Giessuebel (senior, 5'11", 195 pounds), Upsala
 Halfback - Jerry Cole (senior, 6'4", 225 pounds), Southwest Texas
 Halfback - Robert Hardy (senior, 5'10", 175 pounds), Washburn
 Safety - Jerry Harris (senior, 5'11", 170 pounds), Chattanooga
 Safety - Jimbo Pearson (senior, 5'10", 170 pounds), Middle Tennessee

Second team

Offense
 Quarterback - Ben Monroe, Maryville (Tennessee)
 Halfback - Jim Allison, San Diego State
 Halfback - Allen Smith, Findlay
 Fullback - Dave Heide, Concordia (Minnesota)
 End - James Galmin, Tampa
 End - Rich Kotite, Wagner
 Tackle - Dave Grant, Northeast Missouri
 Tackle - Gordon Bossos, Amherst
 Guard - Pat Stump, Northern Michigan
 Guard - Robert Sundberg, Minot State
 Center - Marvin Peterson, Pacific Lutheran

Defense
 Defensive end - John Beane, West Virginia Tech
 Defensive end - Gary DeColati, Montana State
 Defensive tackle - Larry Hand, Appalachian
 Defensive tackle - Jerry Jacobs, North Dakota
 Linebacker - Dan Davis, University of the South
 Linebacker - Jack Hambelton, Lewis & Clark
 Linebacker - Dave Jones, Fort Hays
 Halfback - Jeff Kremer, Winona State
 Halfback - Timothy Chilcutt, Austin Peay
 Safety - Jerry Wonder, Luther
 Safety - Randy Jackson, Texas A&I

See also
 1964 College Football All-America Team

References

Little All-America college football team
Little All-America college football team
Little All-America college football teams